The Thulin G was a Swedish military reconnaissance aircraft built in the late 1910s.

Design and development
The Thulin G was a two-seat biplane of conventional configuration derived from the Albatros B.II that seated the observer and the pilot in separate cockpits in tandem. The upper wing was supported by 12 struts from the underwing and four supports from the fuselage. The inline engine was mounted in the aircraft's nose where it drove a wooden propeller . The exhaust gases from the engine were led via a manifold to pass above the upper wing. The pilot was seated in the front cockpit which was placed under the wing while the observer was seated in a cockpit behind the wings to allow good visibility to the sides. The Type G used floats for takeoff and landing on water.

Operational history
Five Type G and two Type GA aircraft were built for the Swedish naval air force, serving from 1917-1922. All but two aircraft were lost in accidents or destroyed in hangar fires.

Operators

Swedish Navy

Variants
Thulin G powered by a Benz Bz.III engine
Thulin GA powered by Curtiss engine

Specifications (Type G)

See also

References

Biplanes
Single-engined tractor aircraft
1910s Swedish aircraft
Aircraft first flown in 1917